Anna Chakvetadze was the defending champion, but lost in the quarterfinals to Marion Bartoli.

Aleksandra Wozniak won her first and only WTA tour title, defeating Bartoli in the final 7–5, 6–3.

Seeds
The top four seeds received a bye into the second round.

Draw

Finals

Top half

Bottom half

External links
Draw and Qualifying draw

Singles
Bank of the West Classic

fr:Classic de Stanford 2008
pl:Bank of the West Classic 2008